Tallapoosa  is a city in Haralson County, Georgia. The population was 3,170 at the 2010 census, up from 2,789 at the 2000 census.

History
The Georgia General Assembly incorporated Tallapoosa as a town in 1860. The community takes its name from the Tallapoosa River.

Geography
Tallapoosa is located in the western part of Haralson County in northwest Georgia. Its geographic coordinates are  (33.7437, -85.2879).

U.S. Route 78 and Georgia State Route 100 are the main highways through the city. U.S. 78 runs through the city from east to west as Atlanta Street, leading southeast  to Waco and west  to Fruithurst, Alabama. GA-100 runs north-south through the city concurrent with U.S. 78, leading north  to Cedartown and south  to Bowdon. I-20 leads east  to Atlanta and west  to Birmingham, Alabama. 

Demographics

2020 census

As of the 2020 United States census, there were 3,227 people, 1,368 households, and 789 families residing in the city.

2000 census
As of the 2000 census, there were 2,789 people, 1,187 households, and 764 families residing in the city. The racial makeup of the city was 91.18% White, 6.63% African American, 0.22% Native American, 0.90% Asian, 0.07% from other races, and 1.00% from two or more races. Hispanic or Latino of any race were 0.32% of the population.

There were 1,187 households, out of which 28.3% had children under the age of 18 living with them, 46.3% were married couples living together, 14.9% had a female householder with no husband present, and 35.6% were non-families. 32.3% of all households were made up of individuals, and 16.4% had someone living alone who was 65 years of age or older.  The average household size was 2.34 and the average family size was 2.95.

In the city, the population was spread out, with 24.7% under the age of 18, 7.5% from 18 to 24, 26.2% from 25 to 44, 23.8% from 45 to 64, and 17.7% who were 65 years of age or older.  The median age was 38 years. For every 100 females, there were 81.3 males.  For every 100 females age 18 and over, there were 79.6 males.

The median income for a household in the city was $29,938, and the median income for a family was $37,401. Males had a median income of $34,102 versus $21,130 for females. The per capita income for the city was $15,302.  About 12.8% of families and 19.4% of the population were below the poverty line, including 25.0% of those under age 18 and 26.9% of those age 65 or over.

Popular culture
Tallapoosa is mentioned in these works:

The 1933 pre-code movie Baby Face, starring Barbara Stanwyck.
 
The song I've Been Everywhere, a performance of which was recorded by Johnny Cash in 1996.

References

External links
 City of Tallapoosa official website
 Tallapoosa Historical Society
 Historic Tallapoosa historical marker

Cities in Georgia (U.S. state)
Cities in Haralson County, Georgia
Georgia placenames of Native American origin